San José or San Jose (Spanish for Saint Joseph) most often refers to:
San Jose, California, United States 
San José, Costa Rica, the nation's capital

San José or San Jose may also refer to:

Places

Argentina
 San José, Buenos Aires
 San José (Buenos Aires Underground), a railway station
 San José vieja (Buenos Aires Underground), a ghost railway station
 San José, Santa María, Catamarca
 San José, Entre Ríos
 San José de Feliciano, Entre Ríos
 San José de Fray Mamerto Esquiú, Catamarca
 San José de Jáchal, San Juan
 San José de Metán, Salta
 Colonia San José, La Pampa

Belize
 San José, Orange Walk

Bolivia
 San José, Andrés Ibáñez
San José de Chiquitos

Chile
 San José de la Mariquina
 San José de Maipo

Colombia
 San José de Albán, a town and municipality in the Nariño Department
 San José, Caldas, a town and municipality in the Caldas Department
 San José de Pare, a town and municipality in the Boyacá Department
 San José de Cúcuta, a city and municipality in Norte de Santander
 San José de la Fragua, a town and municipality in the Caquetá Department
 San José de las Lagunas, the seat of the Roberto Payán municipality in the Nariño Department
 San José de Ocune, a town and municipality in the Vichada Department
 San José del Guaviare, a town and municipality in the Guaviare Department
 Valle de San José, a town and municipality in the Santander Department

Costa Rica
 San José, Costa Rica, the capital of Costa Rica and of the province of San José
 Juan Santamaría International Airport (SJO)
 San José Province
 San José (canton), a canton in the province of San José
 San José de Alajuela, a village and district in the canton of Alajuela in the province of Alajuela
 San José District, Grecia, a district in the canton of Grecia in the province of Alajuela
 San José District, Atenas, a district in the canton of Atenas in the province of Alajuela
 San José District, Naranjo, a district in the canton of Naranjo in the province of Alajuela 
 San José District, Upala, a district in the canton of Upala in the province of Alajuela
 San José de la Montaña District, a district in the canton of Barva in the province of Heredia
 San José District, San Isidro, a district in the canton of San Isidro in the province of Heredia

Guatemala

 San José, El Petén
 San José, Escuintla
 San José Acatempa
 San José Chacayá
 San José El Idolo
 San José La Arada
 San José Ojetenam
 San José Pinula
 San José Poaquil
 San José del Golfo
 Puerto San José

Honduras
 San José, La Paz
 San José, Copán

Mexico
 San José, Sonora, a place affected by Hurricane Paine
 San José del Cabo, Baja California Sur
 San José Iturbide, Guanajuato
 San José Villa de Allende, State of México
 San José Ayuquila, Oaxaca
 San José Chiltepec, Oaxaca
 San José Chinantequilla, Oaxaca
 San José del Peñasco, Oaxaca
 San José del Progreso, Oaxaca
 San José Estancia Grande, Oaxaca
 San José Independencia, Oaxaca
 San José Lachiguirí, Oaxaca
 San José Tenango, Oaxaca
 San José Tzal, Yucatán

Panama
 David, Panama or San José de David
 San José, Calobre, Veraguas
 San José, Cañazas, Veraguas
 San José, Los Santos
 San José, Panamá Oeste
 San José, San Francisco, Veraguas

Paraguay
 San José de los Arroyos
 San José Obrero

Philippines
 San Jose, Batangas
 San Jose, Camarines Sur
 San Jose, Dinagat Islands
 San Jose, Negros Oriental
 San Jose, Northern Samar
 San Jose, Nueva Ecija
 San Jose, Occidental Mindoro
 San Jose, Romblon
 San Jose, Tarlac
 San Jose de Buan, Samar
 San Jose de Buenavista, Antique
 San Jose del Monte, Bulacan
 San Jose Sico, Batangas, Batangas

Puerto Rico
 San José (Oriente), a sector of Oriente

Spain
 San José (Almería)
 San José del Valle, Cádiz
 Sant Josep de sa Talaia (municipality), Balearic Islands
 Sant Josep de sa Talaia, a village in the municipality

United States

 San Jose, Graham County, Arizona
 San Jose, California, the largest city in the world named San Jose
 Downtown San Jose, the business district
 San Jose International Airport
 a defunct San Jose Township, Los Angeles County, California
 San Jose, Illinois
 San Jose, San Miguel County, New Mexico
 San Jose, Rio Arriba County, New Mexico

Northern Mariana Islands
 San Jose, Tinian
 San Jose, Saipan village, a populated place in the Northern Mariana Islands

Uruguay
 San José de Mayo
 San José Department
San José de Carrasco

Cuba
San José de las Lajas

Islands
 Weddell Island or Isla San José, Falkland Islands
 Isla San José (Baja California Sur), Mexico
 San José Island (Texas)
 Isla San José (Panama)

Institutions and organizations
 Club San José, a Bolivian football team
 Mission San José (California), a historical Spanish mission Fremont, California, USA
 Mission San José (Texas), a historical Spanish mission in Texas, USA
 San Jose Earthquakes, an MLS soccer/football team
 San Jose Sharks, an NHL ice hockey team
 San Jose SaberCats, an AFL arena football team

Colleges and universities
 San Jose Seminary, part of Ateneo de Manila University in Quezon City, Philippines
 San Jose State University, California, United States
 University of San Jose–Recoletos, Cebu City, Philippines

Other uses
 6216 San Jose, an asteroid
 Palacio San José, a historical building and museum in Entre Ríos, Argentina
 San José Mine, a mine in Copiapó, Chile
 San Jose River, a river in the Cariboo region of British Columbia, Canada
 San José Volcano, a volcano on the Chilean–Argentine border
 San José (galleon), a ship sunk during Wager's Action in 1708
 HMS San Josef (1797) or San José, a Spanish ship captured by the Royal Navy in 1797
 Julie Anne San Jose, Filipina singer
 2021 San Jose shooting, a mass shooting that killed ten people including the gunman

See also
 Colegio San José (disambiguation)
 Colonia San José (disambiguation)
 Saint Joseph (disambiguation)
 São José (disambiguation)
 San Giuseppe (disambiguation)
 
 
 Sankt Josef